The A499 road is the major road of the Llŷn peninsula in North Wales.

Its northern terminus is a roundabout with the A487 trunk road between Llanwnda and Llandwrog  It then runs south-westerly along the northern coast of the peninsula, through Clynnog Fawr then turns inland crossing the peninsula to meet the southern coast at Pwllheli, it then follows that southern coast to terminate at Abersoch 

The total length is 23.4 miles. At no point is it a trunk road, although the Welsh Assembly has considered upgrading its status.

Improvements 

Work started in February 2008 to upgrade the road between Aberdesach and Llanaelhaearn and also bypass Clynnog Fawr. This work is expected to complete in Summer 2009. Previous work in 2006/2007 had cleared the new route of trees and erected boundary fencing.

See also
British road numbering scheme

References 

Roads in Gwynedd